Creek Township is one of thirteen townships in DeWitt County, Illinois, USA.  As of the 2010 census, its population was 471 and it contained 206 housing units.  The township contains the east half of Weldon Springs State Park.

Geography

Unincorporated towns
 Lane at

Cemeteries
The township contains these two cemeteries: Lisenby and Rose.

Airports and landing strips
 Martin RLA Airport

School districts
 Argenta-Oreana Community Unit School District 1
 Clinton Community Unit School District 15
 Deland-Weldon Community Unit School District 57
 Maroa-Forsyth Community Unit School District 2

Political districts
 Illinois's 15th congressional district
 State House District 87
 State Senate District 44

References

External links
 City-Data.com
 
 Township Officials of Illinois

Townships in DeWitt County, Illinois
1858 establishments in Illinois
Populated places established in 1858
Townships in Illinois